Arkology may refer to:
 Arkology (album), 1997 compilation album by Lee "Scratch" Perry
 Arcology, a proposed type of massive habitation building
 Arkeology (The Ark album), 2011
 Arkeology (World Party album), 2012
 Searches for Noah's Ark